Patrick "Pat" Fox (born 8 July 1962) is a former Irish sportsperson. He played hurling with his local club Éire Óg Annacarty GAA and with the Tipperary GAA senior inter-county team in the 1980s and 1990s.

Playing career

Club
Fox played his club hurling with his local parish club Éire Óg and he enjoyed some success with the club.

Inter-county
Fox first came to prominence as a member of the Tipperary minor hurling team in the late 1970s.  He had little success in this grade as Cork GAA dominated the Munster Championship.  Fox later joined the Tipp under-21 team, however, he missed the teams Munster final victory in 1979.  In spite of this he later collected an All-Ireland as Tipp defeated Galway GAA.  Fox won his first Munster under-21 medal in 1980 and, once again, this was subsequently converted into a second All-Ireland medal.  In 1981 he added a second Munster under-21 medal to his collection before claiming a third consecutive All-Ireland under-21 medal.

Fox subsequently joined the Tipperary senior hurling panel, however, the early 1980s was not a successful period for the team.  In 1987, however, he won his first senior Munster title following a classic Munster final replay against Cork.  His side were subsequently defeated by Galway in the All-Ireland semi-final.  Fox won a National Hurling League medal and a second Munster medal in 1988, however, Tipp were once again beaten by Galway in the All-Ireland final.  1989 saw Fox add a third Munster medal to his collection.  Tipp later defeated Antrim in the championship decider on a score line of 4-24 to 3-9 and Fox won his first senior All-Ireland title.  Tipp lost their Munster crown to Cork in 1990, however, they regained it in 1991 and Fox collected a fourth provincial title.  He later won a second All-Ireland medal following a defeat of Kilkenny in the final.  Fox’s performance in the entire championship earned him the Hurler of the Year accolade.  Tipp lost their provincial crown again in 1992, however, the team bounced back in 1993 and Fox won a fifth Munster title.  His last appearance in a Tipp senior jersey was as a substitute in the 1996 Munster Hurling Final replay.

Famous quote
Fox became well known to the public at large due to radio sports commentator Micheál Ó Muircheartaigh's famous delivery during a particularly exciting hurling encounter:

 "Pat Fox has it on his hurl and is motoring well now ... but here comes Joe Rabbitte hot on his tail ...... I've seen it all now, a Rabbitte chasing a Fox around Croke Park!"

References

External links
GAA Info Profile

1961 births
Living people
Tipperary inter-county hurlers
Éire Óg Annacarty hurlers
Munster inter-provincial hurlers
All-Ireland Senior Hurling Championship winners